Charlie George Hawkins (born 14 February 1991) is a British former actor. He was born and raised in Islington.

His most notable roles are Darren Miller in the BBC soap opera EastEnders, which he was in from 2004 to 2011, and a cub scout named Tyrone in Ali G Indahouse.

Hawkins attended Holloway Secondary School in Islington, London, following which he attended Central Foundation Boys' School.

Filmography

References

External links

 BBC website character and actor profile 

1991 births
Living people
People from Islington (district)
People educated at Holloway School
People educated at Central Foundation Boys' School
English male soap opera actors
English male child actors